Margit Borg (born 15 June 1969) is a Swedish badminton player, born in Mariestad. She competed in women's singles and women's doubles at the 1996 Summer Olympics in Atlanta.

References

External links

1969 births
Living people
Swedish female badminton players
Olympic badminton players of Sweden
Badminton players at the 1996 Summer Olympics
People from Mariestad Municipality
Sportspeople from Västra Götaland County
20th-century Swedish women